Taştepe can refer to:

 Taştepe, Ezine
 Taştepe, Lapseki